Carlsten is a surname. Notable people known by this name include the following:

 Bruce Carlsten (born 1058), American engineer 
 Rune Carlsten (1890–1970), Swedish actor, screenwriter and film director

See also

Carsten (disambiguation)
Carlsen
Carlston (name)